Jerzy Dzięcioł (1 September 1911 – 28 August 2004) was a Polish sailor. He competed in the O-Jolle event at the 1936 Summer Olympics.

References

External links
 

1911 births
2004 deaths
Polish male sailors (sport)
Olympic sailors of Poland
Sailors at the 1936 Summer Olympics – O-Jolle
Sportspeople from Warsaw
People from Warsaw Governorate